Allium anacoleum is a plant species in the amaryllis family and is native to Turkey and Iraq.

References 

anacoleum
Flora of Turkey
Flora of Iraq